Color Developing Agent 1 (CD-1) is the first in the series of color developing agents used in developing color films. It is the organic compound N,N-diethyl-1,4-benzenediamine (DPD), which is usually in the form of the monohydrochloride salt.  In color development, after reducing a silver atom in a silver halide crystal, the oxidized developing agent combines with a color coupler to form a color dye molecule.

Arthur Thomas Palin, a Fellow of the Royal Society of Chemistry, developed a widely-used color based method of water testing using DPD to indicate the chlorine content of treated water.

See Also
 Color Developing Agent 2
 Color Developing Agent 3
 Color Developing Agent 4

References

Photographic chemicals
Anilines